Kari Rolfsen (12 October 1938 – 8 December 2020) was a Norwegian sculptor and illustrator.

Career
Rolfsen was born in Oslo, a daughter of Aase Espetvedt and Rolf Rolfsen, and was married to Karl Erik Harr. She studied at the Norwegian National Academy of Craft and Art Industry and further at the Norwegian National Academy of Fine Arts under the supervision of Per Palle Storm, further at Accademia di Belle Arti di Firenze in Firenze, and at the Royal Danish Academy of Fine Arts under supervision of Mogens Bøggild.

Her sculptural works include På vei til bingo? (1975), Gammel kone med veske (1978; Gjøvik) and statue of Kristin Lavransdatter (1972), bust of Gisle Straume, reliefs of Andreas Mørch, Sigrid Undset and Cecilie Thoresen, and monument of Theodor Kittelsen. She illustrated books, including Constance Ring by Amalie Skram, covers of folk music albums, and she created the comics series Jensen in the feminist magazine Sirene. 

She is represented with works in the National Museum of Art, Architecture and Design in Oslo.

Rolfsen died in Oslo on 8 December 2020.

References

1938 births
2020 deaths
Artists from Oslo
Norwegian women artists
Norwegian illustrators
Norwegian sculptors
Oslo National Academy of the Arts alumni